Petrove Raion was a raion (district) of Kirovohrad Oblast in central Ukraine. It covered an area of 1195 square kilometres. The administrative center lied at Petrove. The raion was established on March 7, 1923. The raion was abolished on 18 July 2020 as part of the administrative reform of Ukraine, which reduced the number of raions of Kirovohrad Oblast to four. The area of Petrove Raion was merged into Oleksandriia Raion.

The raion was subdivided into 15 communities known as councils (rada): 2 town councils and 13 village councils.

At the time of disestablishment, the raion consisted of one hromada, Petrove settlement hromada with the administration in Petrove.

References

External links
Official site 

Former raions of Kirovohrad Oblast
1923 establishments in Ukraine
Ukrainian raions abolished during the 2020 administrative reform